The Jar: A Tale From the East is a Syrian feature-length animated Islamic film that was made in 1999. The film itself is based on a true story that was narrated over 1400 years ago during the early Islamic Civilisation. "The Jar" is an epic that deals with a struggle between good and evil.

Plot
Based on a story with some historical elements from over 1400 years ago, The Jar deals with the epic struggle between good and evil and highlights the ethics and virtues of traditional family values. Set in a Middle Eastern village, the story of the jar begins when a poor yet virtuous family discovers a lost treasure buried in a jar under their new home. In their quest to return the jar to its rightful owner, a jealous and greedy neighbour who has his eye on the jar foils their attempts to return it. An adventure ensues as the towns-folk try to solve the mystery of the jar. A fantastical subplot includes two mice who steal the family's eggs but are defeated by the family's pet squirrel.

Cast (English version)
 Tony Daniels
 Jeff Lumby
 John Stocker
 Barbara Radecki
 Julie Lemieux
 Chris Marren
 Carolyn Scott
 Oliver Dawson
 Ron Rubin
 François Klanfer

Awards
This animated movie has received the following Awards and Endorsements:

 The Dove Foundation - Endorsement
 The Film Advisory Board - Award of Excellence
 Coalition for Quality Children's Media - Endorsement
 Santa Clarita International film Festival - Finalist Award

See also
 List of Islamic films
 List of animated Islamic films
Fatih Sultan Muhammad
The Boy and the King

References

External links
The Internet Movie Database - The Jar: A Tale from the East
Fine Media Group - Press and Awards
Amazon - The Jar - A Tale From The East

1999 animated films
Islamic animated films
Syrian animated films
Syrian children's films